The Journal of Chemical Physics is a scientific journal published by the American Institute of Physics that carries research papers on chemical physics.  Two volumes, each of 24 issues, are published annually. It was established in 1933 when Journal of Physical Chemistry editors refused to publish theoretical works.

The editors have been:
2019-present: Tim Lian
2008–2018: Marsha I. Lester
2007–2008: Branka M. Ladanyi
1998–2007: Donald H. Levy
1983–1997: John C. Light
1960–1982: J. Willard Stout
1958–1959: Clyde A. Hutchison Jr.
1956–1957 (Acting): Joseph Edward Mayer
1953–1955: Clyde A. Hutchison Jr.
1942–1952: Joseph E. Mayer
1933–1941: Harold Urey

Highlights
According to the Web of Science database, as to 15 March 2018, a total of 132,435 articles have been published in the Journal of Chemical Physics.  The number of articles published per year was about 180 in the 1930s and decreased to about 120 during second world war. After the war the number of articles increased steadily, reaching about 1800 articles/year in 1970. The publishing rate remained fairly stable at this level until about 1990, when it climbed up again reaching a maximum of 2871 articles published in 2014. It has since decreased somewhat to 2300 articles/year in the period 2015-2017.

As to 15 March 2018 and according to Web of Science, the ten most cited articles published in the Journal of Chemical Physics are:
 A. D. Becke, Density Functional Thermochemistry. 3. The role of exact exchange, 98(7), 5648-5652 (1993) [65 911 citations]
 N. Metropolis, A. W. Rosenbluth, M. N. Rosenbluth, Equation of state calculations by fast computing machines, 21(6), 1087-1092 (1953) [19 444 citations]
 W. L. Jorgensen, J. Chandrasekhar, J. D. Madura et al, Comparison of simple potential functions for simulating liquid water, 79(2), 926-935 (1983) [19 397 citations]
 T. H. Dunning, Gaussian basis sets for use in correlated molecular calculations. 1. The atoms boron through neon and hydrogen, 90(2), 1007-2013 (1989), [18 999 citations]
 H. J. C. Berendsen, J. P. M. Postma, W. F. Van Gunsteren et al, Molecular dynamics with coupling to an external bath, 81(8), 3684-3690 (1984), [15 826 citations]
 T. Darden, D. York, J. Pedersen, Particle mesh Ewald - An N log(N) method for Ewald sums in large Systems, 98(12), 10089-10092 (1993) [11 591 citations]
 P. J. Hay, W. R. Wadt, Ab initio effective core potentials for molecular calculations - Potentials for K to Au including the outermost core orbitals, 82(1), 299-310 (1985), [11 195 citations]
 R. F. Stewart, E. R. Davidson, W. T. Simpson, Coherent X-ray scattering for hydrogen atom in hydrogen molecule, 42(9), 3175 (1965) [10 346 citations]
 W. J. Hehre, R. Ditchfield, J. A. Pople, Self-consistent molecular-orbital methods. 12. Further extensions of Gaussian-type basis sets for use in molecular-orbital studies of organic molecules, 56(5), 2257 (1972) [10 279 citations]
 R. Krishnan, J. S. Binkley, R. Seeger et al, Self-consistent molecular-orbital methods. 20. Basis set for correlated wave-functions, 72(1), 650-654 (1980) [9 558 citations]   

By the standards of chemical physics these are huge numbers of citations and all of these papers should be considered pivotal.

See also
 Annual Review of Physical Chemistry
 Russian Journal of Physical Chemistry A
 Russian Journal of Physical Chemistry B

References

External links
Journal home page
American Institute of Physics
American Institute of Physics Journals

Chemical physics journals
American Institute of Physics academic journals
Publications established in 1933
English-language journals